Jersey County is a county located in the U.S. state of Illinois. At the 2020 census, it had a population of 21,512. The county seat and largest community is Jerseyville, with a population of 8,337 in 2010. The county's smallest incorporated community is Otterville, with a population of 87.

Jersey County is included in the St. Louis, MO-IL Metropolitan Statistical Area.

History
Jersey County lies just northeast of where the great Mississippi and Illinois rivers meet. It is the former home of the Kickapoo, Menomini, Potawatomi, and Illiniwek Confederation American Indians.  The first European explorers to visit the area, Father Marquette and Louis Jolliet, arrived in 1673, where they encountered the fearsome painting of the Piasa bird.  The present day Pere Marquette State Park, located near Grafton, is named in Father Marquette's honor, and a monument to him is located at the park.

Jersey County was founded on February 28, 1839, and was formed out of Greene County. The county was named for the state of New Jersey, from which many of the early settlers emigrated - which was itself named for the Channel Island of Jersey in Great Britain.  The area quickly evolved into several small agricultural communities. As the area soon began to flourish, a county government was established and a courthouse was built in Jerseyville, the county seat. The Jersey County Courthouse was designed by architect Henry Elliott who also designed the courthouses in nearby Greene County, Edgar County, Illinois, DeWitt County, Illinois (later demolished in 1987) and Pike County, Illinois. The cornerstone for the courthouse was laid on July 4, 1893. The Romanesque Revival style courthouse is a magnificent architectural structure of limestone quarried from the nearby town of Grafton, Illinois.

Recent history
Today, while the county maintains its agricultural base, it is also within commuting distance of jobs and industry in St. Louis, Missouri and the surrounding area.  A large portion of the population works outside of Jersey County and benefits from being "Near the crowd, but not in it.", the official slogan of the Jersey County Business Association's advertising campaign. The bordering rivers play an important part in Jersey County's economy by supporting agricultural producers and agribusiness, and by creating a strong tourist market. Education, manufacturing, and retail are also among the county's largest industries.

Geography
Jersey County is bordered by three bodies of water: the Mississippi River to the south, the Illinois River to the west, and Macoupin Creek to the northwest.

Climate

Typically, the county's climate reflects most Midwest areas, located in the transitional zone between the humid continental climate type and the humid subtropical climate type (Köppen Dfa and Cfa, respectively), with neither large mountains nor large bodies of water to moderate its temperature. Spring is the wettest season and produces severe weather ranging from tornadoes to snow or ice storms. Summers are hot and humid, and the humidity often makes the heat index rise to temperatures feeling well above . Fall is mild with lower humidity and can produce intermittent bouts of heavy rainfall with the first snow flurries usually forming in late November. Winters can be cold at times with periodic light snow and temperatures below freezing.

Major highways
  U.S. Route 67
  Illinois Route 3
  Illinois Route 16
  Illinois Route 100
  Illinois Route 109
  Illinois Route 111
  Illinois Route 267

Adjacent counties

State protected areas
 Mississippi River State Fish and Wildlife Area
 Pere Marquette State Park

National protected areas
 Two Rivers National Wildlife Refuge (eastern portion)

Demographics

As of the 2010 United States Census, there were 22,985 people, 8,828 households, and 6,228 families residing in the county. The racial makeup of the county was 97.6% white, 0.4% black or African American, 0.3% Asian, 0.3% American Indian, 0.2% from other races, and 1.2% from two or more races. Those of Hispanic or Latino origin made up 1.0% of the population. In terms of ancestry, 42.8% were German, 14.7% were Irish, 10.6% were English, and 8.6% were American.

Of the 8,828 households, 31.9% had children under the age of 18 living with them, 56.4% were married couples living together, 9.7% had a female householder with no husband present, 29.5% were non-families, and 25.0% of all households were made up of individuals. The average household size was 2.51 and the average family size was 2.98. The median age was 40.5 years.

The median income for a household in the county was $53,470 and the median income for a family was $64,773. Males had a median income of $48,750 versus $31,789 for females. The per capita income for the county was $24,368. About 5.6% of families and 8.5% of the population were below the poverty line, including 8.4% of those under age 18 and 7.1% of those age 65 or over.

Communities

Cities
 Grafton
 Jerseyville

Villages
 Brighton
 Elsah
 Fidelity
 Fieldon

Town
 Otterville

Unincorporated communities

 Beltrees
 Chautauqua
 Delhi
 Dow
 East Newbern
 Kemper
 Lake Piasa
 Lockhaven
 McClusky
 Newbern
 New Delhi
 Nutwood
 Reardon
 Reddish
 Rosedale
 Spankey

Townships
Jersey County is divided into eleven townships:

 Elsah Township
 English Township
 Fidelity Township
 Jersey Township
 Mississippi Township
 Otter Creek Township
 Piasa Township
 Quarry Township
 Richwood Township
 Rosedale Township
 Ruyle Township

Population ranking
The population ranking of the following table is based on the 2020 census of Jersey County.

† county seat

Education

Unified school districts
 Alton Community Unit School District 11 - serves a very small portion of southern Jersey County (east of Elsah), along with northwestern Madison County.
 Greenfield Community Unit School District 10 - serves a very small portion of northeastern Jersey County (west of Kemper), along with eastern Greene County.
 Jersey Community Unit School District 100 - serves most of Jersey County, and a small portion of southern Greene County.
 Southwestern Community Unit School District 9 - serves the northeastern and southeastern portions of Jersey County, along with southwestern Macoupin County.

High schools
 Jersey Community High School, located in Jerseyville.

Colleges and universities
 Principia College, located near Elsah.

Government

Local

The Republican Party holds five of eight countywide elected positions as of 2022 as well as an eleven to one majority on the county board.

Jersey County is part of Regional Office of Education #40 which includes neighboring Macoupin, Calhoun and Greene counties. The office operates a facility in Jerseyville.

State
Jersey County is divided into two legislative districts in the Illinois House of Representatives:
 District 100 - Currently represented by C. D. Davidsmeyer (R-Jacksonville) and consists of the majority of the county and includes the cities of Jerseyville and Grafton.
 District 111 - Currently represented by Amy Elik (R-Fosterburg) and consists of the southern portion of the county and includes the village of Elsah.

The county is also divided into two legislative districts in the Illinois Senate:
 District 50 - Currently represented by Steve McClure (R-Springfield) and consists of the majority of the county and includes the cities of Jerseyville and Grafton.
 District 56 - Currently represented by Kristopher Tharp (D-Wood River) and consists of the southern portion of the county and includes the village of Elsah.

Federal

Jersey County's federal political history is fairly typical of “anti-Yankee” Southern Illinois counties. It voted solidly Democratic until Warren G. Harding carried the county in his record 1920 landslide. It voted Republican again in Herbert Hoover's landslide of 1920 and 1928, but otherwise was firmly Democratic until World War II, when opposition to US involvement turned the county to Wendell Willkie and then Thomas E. Dewey. Between 1948 and 2004, Jersey County became something of a bellwether county, voting for every winning Presidential candidate except in the Catholicism-influenced 1960 election, and that of 1988 which was heavily influenced by a major Midwestern drought. Disagreement with the Democratic Party’s liberal views on social issues since the 1990s has caused a powerful swing back to the Republicans in the past quarter-century. As is typical of the Upland South, Hillary Clinton in 2016 did far worse than any previous Democrat, while Joe Biden performed marginally better in the 2020 election.

Jersey County is located in Illinois's 15th congressional district and is currently represented by Mary Miller (R-Oakland) in the U.S. House of Representatives.

See also 
 Jersey County Journal
 National Register of Historic Places listings in Jersey County, Illinois

References

External links
 Jersey County government website
 Jersey County Clerk website
 Jersey County Health Department website
 Jersey County Business Association website
 Jersey County fact sheet

 
Illinois counties
1839 establishments in Illinois
Populated places established in 1839
Jersey County, Illinois
Illinois counties on the Mississippi River